Ulmus pumila, or 'Poort Bulten,' is a Siberian elm cultivar that hails from Arboretum Poort Bulten in Losser, Netherlands. This tree was for many years mistaken for Planera aquatica or 'water elm' and commercially propagated under that name.

Description 
The tree has smaller, paler, green leaves than the type, while the trunk has a very rough bark. Planera and Ulmus fruit are easily distinguished, so the identity confusion in Losser suggests that the original specimen was slow to produce seed.

Pests and diseases
See under Ulmus pumila.

Cultivation
'Poort Bulten' is not known to have been introduced to North America or Australasia.

Putative specimens
A young Siberian elm with rough bark and leaves smaller than those of 'Pinnato-ramosa', that remain light green all summer, stands near the entrance to Rocheid Path at the northern end of Arboretum Avenue, Edinburgh (2018). Though planted c.1980, the tree does not yet produce fruit (2021).

Synonymy
Planera aquatica in error.

Accessions
Europe
 Arboretum Poort Bulten , Acc. no. LOS0252, Losser, Netherlands.
 Wijdemeren City Council, Elm Arboretum, 2 trees planted 2019: Brilhoek and Hornhof cemetery, Nederhorst den Berg

Nurseries

Europe
Noordplant , Glimmen, Netherlands.

Notes

External links
 U. pumila 'Poort Bulten', arboretum-poortbulten.nl
  Ulmus formerly labelled Planera aquatica (specimen from Zuiderpark, Den Haag, 1955)
  Ulmus formerly labelled Planera aquatica (specimen from Hillier & Sons, Winchester, 1952)  
  Ulmus formerly labelled Planera aquatica (specimen from Arboretum national des Barres, Nogent-sur-Vernisson, 1949)   

Siberian elm cultivar
Ulmus articles with images
Ulmus